Nurse 3D is a 2013 American erotic horror thriller film directed by Doug Aarniokoski and written by Aarniokoski and David Loughery. Inspired by the photography of Lionsgate's chief marketing officer, Tim Palen, the film stars Paz de la Huerta, Katrina Bowden, and Corbin Bleu. de la Huerta plays Abby Russell, a nurse and serial killer who targets men who cheat on their partners, and who develops an unhealthy relationship with fellow nurse Danni (Bowden). Production took place from September to October 2011. During post-production, de la Huerta's dialogue was dubbed over by a sound-alike.

Nurse 3D premiered at the Zurich Film Festival on September 28, 2013. It was later released on February 7, 2014, in selected theaters and on video-on-demand (VOD). It received mixed reviews, with criticism being aimed at its screenplay. That same year, de la Huerta received workers' compensation for a spinal injury she received during filming.

Plot

Abby Russell is a serial killer; she murders men who cheat on the women they date. She slices through one man's femoral artery and then throws him off the roof of a nightclub. The following day, she attends the graduation ceremony of nurse Danni Rodgers, a student she mentored, and meets Danni's mother and stepfather, Larry Cook. However, Danni is ill-prepared for her first day of duty, and her superior, Dr. Morris, berates her for not responding quickly to an emergency. Abby views the situation with disgust, as she knows that Dr. Morris is a sadist who enjoys harassing new nurses or "breaking them in."

Abby is further irritated when Danni chooses to call her paramedic boyfriend, Steve, for support rather than approaching Abby herself. She is pleased when Danni's call to Steve ends badly due to a fight over Danni's refusal to move in with him. She explains to Abby that she is unwilling to trust her stepfather enough to leave him alone with her mother. This distrust is later justified when Abby and Danni witness her stepfather having an affair while the two women are on their way to go drinking at a nightclub, which results in Danni drinking that night. Unbeknownst to her, however, Abby spikes her drink with a date rape drug, enabling Abby to get Danni to have sex with both her and random strangers. The next day, Danni wakes to find herself in Abby's apartment and leaves, despite Abby's plea for Danni to skip work and spend the day with her. Afterwards, Abby downloads several photos that she had taken from the previous night before leaving to see a psychiatrist, revealed to be Larry.

Abby seduces Larry by saying that she's addicted to men, alluding to her past history with her father. Confirming that he is unfaithful to Danni's mother, Abby shows up at his place of work one day and convinces him to give her a ride, during which she paralyzes him with vecuronium bromide, resulting in a car accident. After hearing of her stepfather's death, Danni seeks solace from Abby, only for Abby to grow angry when Danni says she will move in with her boyfriend. Abby comments that she hopes that Larry's genitals were severed in the car crash. When Danni realizes that Abby knows about the car crash, even though Danni never told her how he died, Danni leaves. This infuriates Abby, who decides that she will now hurt Danni instead of helping her. She slowly convinces Detective John Rogan that Danni is mentally unstable and obsessed with Abby.

The next day, Abby runs into Rachel Adams, a new human resources employee who remarks that Abby greatly resembles a girl she knew that was sent to a mental institution. Abby invites Rachel out for drinks and takes the opportunity to harass Danni by calling her via Skype and showing Danni a video of Abby injecting chemicals into Rachel. Danni tries to go to the police, only for Detective Rogan to dismiss her claims as evidence of her trying to hurt Abby because the other woman didn't return her affections. He uses the photographs Abby took as proof to this effect, which Steve sees as a result of Danni summoning him to the police station for support. This prompts an argument between the two, and Steve leaves in a fit of anger. Danni tries to approach Dr. Morris for help, only for him to use this as an opportunity to blackmail Abby into having sex with him. Abby initially pretends to agree to this arrangement but uses the opportunity to dismember and murder him. That same night Abby also knocks out Rachel and drags her away to her death.

Danni goes to the mental institution referred to by Rachel. She learns about Sarah Price, a little girl who killed her father after learning he was having an affair and witnessing him severely beating her mother. Danni discovers that a nurse named Abigail Russell at the institution took in Sarah. Danni then realizes that Abby is Sarah and has taken the name of her caretaker. Danni then tries to call Rachel to warn her about Abby, only to find that Rachel's phone is in her car. She then receives a call from Abby who was just having sex with a cop, who implies that she will kill Steve similarly to Rachel.

Danni rushes to the hospital, where she and Abby begin to fight. The staff initially tries to intervene, only for Abby to set off on a killing spree and lock herself into a lab. Danni and Steve pursue her, and Abby stabs Steve in the neck and runs off. Abby rushes home, where Detective Rogan confronts her. Noticing her neighbor Jared, Abby pretends that Rogan is trying to rob her. Her neighbor then bludgeons the detective with a bat, killing him instantly. Her neighbor is horrified to discover that Rogan is a cop, but Abby convinces him to hide the body, saying that Rogan was corrupt, and Jared would be badly treated since he is now a cop killer. Abby assumes the identity of human resources employee Rachel Adams.

Cast
 Paz de la Huerta as Abby Russell/Sarah Price
 Katia Peel as young Abby/young Sarah
 Katrina Bowden as Danni Rodgers
 Kathleen Turner as Head Nurse Betty Watson
 Judd Nelson as Dr. Robert Morris
 Corbin Bleu as Steve
Melanie Scrofano as Rachel Adams
Martin Donovan as Larry Cook
 Boris Kodjoe as Detective John Rogan
 Michael Eklund as Richie
 Niecy Nash as Regina
Tracy Michailidis as Abby's mom
Jeff Pangman as Dr. Robert Price
 Adam Herschman as Jared
 Brittany Adams as Young nurse

Production
In 2011, Lionsgate began seeking directors for their new project, then titled The Nurse 3D. On April 15, 2011, they announced that Doug Aarniokoski, the second unit director for Resident Evil: Extinction, was signed on to direct, with Shawn Ashmore, Dominic Monaghan, and Ashley Bell confirmed. Zaldy was the costume designer.

Casting
In July 2011 Paz de la Huerta signed on to play Abby Russell, the film's primary antagonist. Dita Von Teese was initially intended to join the cast for a cameo as a nightclub performer, but she later withdrew from the project. Corbin Bleu was brought on in August 2011.

Filming
Principal photography began in Toronto on September 6, 2011 and wrapped on October 21. During filming, de la Huerta was struck by a stunt ambulance which was supposed to drive by her. The production later paid her $73,000 in workers' compensation for her injuries.

Post-production
After filming, de la Huerta recorded additional voice-over material for the film. Unsatisfied with the result, the producers re-recorded the voice-over with another actress emulating de la Huerta's voice.

Reception
On review aggregator Rotten Tomatoes, the film holds an approval rating of 64% based on 25 reviews, with an average rating of 5.9/10. On Metacritic, the film has a weighted average score of 29 out of 100, based on seven critics, indicating "generally unfavorable reviews".

Much of the film's criticism centered upon the film's script, which Neil Genzlinger commented "doesn’t have any of the wit that a film like this needs to give it campy coolness." Peter Sobczynski of RogerEbert.com gave the film a positive review rating it two and a half stars writing "It is ridiculously lurid trash from start to finish and anyone trying to argue otherwise is as crazy as its central character. However, while its aim may be low throughout, it at least comes close to consistently hitting its targets." The Village Voice panned the film overall, opining that it "never truly embrace[d]" its "B-movie trashiness". In contrast, more positive reviews for the film for these same elements and Shock Till You Drop remarked that while they could understand why people would not like the film, it would have a solid appeal for "Those very special people out there with very special tastes that embrace 'the awful' and know how to have a little bit of fun." Fearnet's Scott Weinberg also echoed this sentiment, saying that the movie was "nothing resembling a deep, intellectual, or insightful horror flick" but that it was "however, quite a bit of good, gruesome fun if you enjoy 'body count' horror combined with a basic but serviceable plot yanked straight out of Single White Female."

In 2015, de la Huerta sued the film's producers for $55 million, claiming that the overdub by another actress (her lawsuit quoted a critic as calling it a "monotone performance") had infringed on her rights and damaged her career. The lawsuit was not successful.

References

External links
 
 
 
 
 

2013 films
2013 3D films
2013 horror thriller films
2010s American films
2010s English-language films
2010s erotic thriller films
2010s serial killer films
2010s slasher films
Adultery in films
American erotic horror films
American erotic thriller films
American horror thriller films
American serial killer films
American sexploitation films
American slasher films
Films about nurses
Films directed by Douglas Aarniokoski
Films scored by Anton Sanko
Films set in hospitals
Films shot in Toronto
Films with screenplays by David Loughery
Lionsgate films